Calhoun, Arkansas may refer to the following places in the U.S. state of Arkansas:
Calhoun, Columbia County, Arkansas
Calhoun, Lincoln County, Arkansas
Calhoun County, Arkansas